The 1930 National Championship (Serbo-Croato-Slovenian: Državno prvenstvo 1930. / Државно првенство 1930.) had the number of teams participating raised to six. The champion, Concordia Zagreb, was a newly formed team consisting of previous HAŠK players.

Qualifiers

In 1930, two new sub-associations were formed.  On April 13, the sub-association of Novi Sad was created, which would include the clubs from the districts of Novi Sad, Sremska Mitrovica, and Šabac.  A month later, on May 9, the sub-association of Veliki Bečkerek was formed, including the clubs from Veliki Bečkerek, Vršac, Kikinda, and Pančevo districts.

Just as in the previous seasons, the two best-placed teams from the sub-associations of Belgrade and Zagreb would compete, while the rest of the sub-associations would qualify their champion.  The Yugoslav Football Association, in order to increase the number of teams in the final stage, made some alterations, including that the first two teams positioned in the previous season (Hajduk Split and BSK Belgrade) qualify directly to the final stage.

The representatives were:

Sub-association of Belgrade: BSK Belgrade (qualified directly) and SK Jugoslavija
Sub-association of Zagreb: HAŠK and Concordia Zagreb
Sub-association of Split: Hajduk Split (qualified directly)
Sub-association of Ljubljana: Ilirija
Sub-association of Osijek: Slavija Osijek
Sub-association of Sarajevo: Slavija Sarajevo
Sub-association of Skoplje: Empty
Sub-association of Subotica: Bačka

Qualifying round:
Bačka – Jugoslavija 2:1, 0:6
HAŠK – Slavija Osijek 3:3, 3:3 extra match: 1:1
Ilirija – Concordia 1:6, 0:6
Slavija Sarajevo was qualified as the Sub-association of Skoplje failed to present their team.

The qualified teams were Jugoslavija, Slavija Osijek, Concordia Zagreb, and Slavija Sarajevo.  The first leg matches were played on July 6, with the second leg matches on July 13.  The extra match between Slavija Osijek and HAŠK was played in Osijek on July 14.  The Sub-association of Skoplje failed to present a champion as three clubs finished the league with equal number of points: Jug, SSK, and Sparta.

League table

Results

Winning squad
Champions:

CONCORDIA ZAGREB (coach: Bogdan Cuvaj)

 Sergije Demić (10/0)
 Stjepan Pavičić (10/0)
 Boško Ralić (9/0)
 Nikola Pavelić (8/0)
 Daniel Premerl (6/1)
 Gustav Remec (4/0)
 Miloš Ferić (3/0)
 Radovan Pavelić (10/4)
 Dragutin Babić (10/0)
 Edigio Martinović (10/1)
 Ivan Pavelić (10/10)
 Boris Praunberger (9/3)
 Aleksandar Živković (8/5)
 Vladimir Lolić (1/0)
 Pavao Löw (1/0)
 Božidar Armano (1/0)
Source:

Top scorers
Final goalscoring position, number of goals, player/players and club.
1 - 10 goals - Blagoje Marjanović (BSK Belgrade)
2 - 9 goals - Đorđe Vujadinović (BSK Belgrade)
3 - 7 goals - Ivan Pavelić (Concordia), Leo Lemešić (Hajduk Split)

See also
Yugoslav Cup
Yugoslav League Championship
Football Association of Yugoslavia

References

External links
Yugoslavia Domestic Football Full Tables

1
Yugoslav Football Championship